Heavey is a surname. Notable people bearing it include:
Sean heavey (born 1989), doncaster, the first recorded multi millionaire in the family's history
Aidan Heavey (born 1953), Irish chief executive
John W. Heavey (1867–1941), United States Army general
Martin Heavey (born 1943), Irish Gaelic footballer
Margaret Heavey (1908–1980), academic
William F. Heavey (1896–1974), American brigadier general